Mount Pleasant, Nova Scotia may refer to:
Mount Pleasant, Cumberland County, Nova Scotia
Mount Pleasant, Digby County, Nova Scotia
Mount Pleasant, Inverness County, Nova Scotia
Mount Pleasant, Lunenburg County, Nova Scotia
Mount Pleasant, Queens, Nova Scotia, Region of Queens Municipality